Guo Mengjiao (born ) is a wushu taolu athlete from China. 

Her first major international appearance was at the 2018 Asian Games where she won the gold medal in women's jianshu and qiangshu. At the 2019 World Wushu Championships, Guo faced difficulties with her jianshu and qiangshu routines, but was able to win and become the world champion in changquan. She also competed with the rest of the China wushu team in the group-set event and won another gold medal.

See also 

 List of Asian Games medalists in wushu

References

External links 

 Athlete profile at the 2018 Asian Games

1996 births
Living people
Chinese wushu practitioners
Sportspeople from Hebei
Sportspeople from Shanghai
Asian Games medalists in wushu
Asian Games gold medalists for China
Medalists at the 2018 Asian Games
Wushu practitioners at the 2018 Asian Games